Gabriela Dabrowski and Allie Will were the defending champions, however Will chose not to participate. Dabrowski partnered Anna Tatishvili and successfully defended her title, they defeated Asia Muhammad and Maria Sanchez in the final, 6–3, 6–3.

Seeds

Draw

References 
 Draw

2014 ITF Women's Circuit